Rogerius can refer to the following things:

It is the Latin form of the given name Roger, and was the name of several medieval figures.

Rogerius (physician) (also called Rogerius Salernitanus, Roger Frugard, Roger Frugardi, Roggerio Frugardo, and Roggerio dei Frugardi), a twelfth-century physician and surgeon from Salerno
Rogerius of Apulia, in Italian Ruggero di Puglia, a thirteenth-century churchman who described the Tatar invasions in his work Carmen Miserabile
Rogerius, Romania, a district or quarter (cartier in Romanian) of Oradea, the largest city of Bihor county, Romania